D'Elía is a last name, which may reference to:
 Bill D'Elia, American screenwriter, producer, director and actor
 Carlos D'Elia (or Carlos César Delía; 1923–2014), Argentine equestrian and a brigade general
 Cecilia D'Elia (born 1963), Italian politician
 Chris D'Elia, American comedian and actor
 Christopher D'Elia, American marine biologist
 Fabio D'Elia (born 1983), Liechtenstein football midfielder of Italian origin
 Federico D'Elía, Argentine actor
 Jorge D'Elía, Argentine actor
 José D'Elía, Uruguayan labor leader
 Luis D'Elía, Argentine holocaust denier
 Salvatore D'Elia (born 1989), Italian footballer 
 Sergio D'Elia (born 1952), Italian politician, activist and former left-wing terrorist
 Silvina D'Elía, Argentine field hockey player 
 Sofia Black-D'Elia (born 1991), American actress
 Toshiko D'Elia (1930-2014), American Masters athletics long-distance running legend
 William D'Elia (born 1946), also known as "Big Billy" , Pennsylvania mobster and former leader of the Bufalino crime family